is a Japanese actor.

Biography
Hama was born in Tokyo. In 2014, he won the Sony Music × smart Model Audition Second Prize Grand Prix. The next year, he won Girls Award Award x avex Boys Award Audition Special Prize. In 2018, he was cast in the role of Touma Yoimachi/Lupin Blue on 42nd Super Sentai series Kaitou Sentai Lupinranger VS Keisatsu Sentai Patranger.

Filmography

Television
Shitamachi Rocket (Oct–Dec 2015, TBS)
Zip! (Apr 2016 – Mar 2017, NTV) – Zip! Family; Fashion News Boomers reporter
Gyōretsu no dekiru Hōritsu Sōdan Jimusho (NTV) – Appeared on reproduction VTR
Kaitou Sentai Lupinranger VS Keisatsu Sentai Patranger (11 Feb 2018 –, EX) – as Touma Yoimachi/Lupin Blue (voice)
Coffee & Vanilla (2019) – as Yuki Ichiyanagi
The 13 Lords of the Shogun (NHK, 2022) – as Taira no Koremori
Maiagare! (NHK, 2022) – as Shin'ichi Nakazawa

Films
Jinrō Game –Prison Break– (Jul 2016)
Rolling Marbles (2019)
The Samejima Incident (2020), Ryō
Napoleon and Me (2021), Napoleon
Haiiro no Kabe (2022), Mamase
Manami 100% (2023)

Stage
Gekidan Team-Odac performance Daruma (18–23 Jun 2015, Kinokuniya Hall) – as Kiyora

Magazines
Takarajima smart (Dec 2014 Issue – Apr 2016 Issue) – Regular model

References

External links 

 – Avex Management 

21st-century Japanese male actors
People from Tokyo
1994 births
Living people